Ohio State Route 199 (SR 199) is a north-south highway in northwest Ohio.  Its southern terminus is at an interchange with US 23 just south of Upper Sandusky, and its northern terminus is at US 20 and SR 795 in Perrysburg.

The route begins northerly into Upper Sandusky, and then on to Carey, where it joins US 23.  The two routes run concurrently from Carey to Fostoria.  From there, SR 199 continues to West Millgrove and to US 6, whose route it joins for a mile (1.6 km) as it crosses the Portage River.  The route then continues north to Perrysburg.

History
Most of SR 199 was formerly the route of US 23.  Before 1966, SR 199 was truncated at the south in Fostoria, followed most of the current route of US 23, and was truncated at the north just east of Toledo, Ohio.  In 1966, SR 199 was extended along its current route to Upper Sandusky along US 23's current route from Fostoria to Carey and its old route from Carey to Upper Sandusky.  In 1969, it switched routes with US 23 from Fostoria to Perrysburg.

Major intersections

References

199
Transportation in Wood County, Ohio
Transportation in Wyandot County, Ohio
Transportation in Seneca County, Ohio
U.S. Route 23